Wade Irvine (born 11 December 1986) is an Australian cricketer. He played one List A match for Tasmania in 2009/10.

See also
 List of Tasmanian representative cricketers

References

External links
 

1986 births
Living people
Australian cricketers
Tasmania cricketers
Sportspeople from Canberra